Ravella Venkatarama Rao (30 January 1927 – 10 December 2013) was a Telugu-language writer and poet. He wrote under pen-name, Jayasri.

Life
He was born in Gokinepally village, Mudigonda, Khammamet (now Khammamm) Hyderabad State.  He fought in the Telangana armed struggle against the Nizam and feudal lords. He was jailed for four years. He is survived by wife and four sons wife name is Ravella suguna and sons

 → Ravella Venkatarama Rao  →   Ravella Suguna
 → Ravella Madhava Rao      →   Ravella Aruna        →  Ravella Sri Navya, Ravella Sridivya,  Ravella Sri Kavya 
 → Ravella Maheshwar Rao    →   Ravella Vimala       →  Ravella Naveen
 → Ravella Manohar Varma    →   Ravella Kavitha      →  Ravella Sri Ramya, RAvella Ajay Varma, Ravella Vijay Varma 
 → Ravella Laxamana Varma   →   Ravella Satyavathi   →  Ravella Adithya Varma, Ravella Abhilash Varma

Works
 Ragajyotulu
 Jeevana Raagam
 Chaitanya Sravanti
 Palle Bharati

Awards
He received literary awards given in memory of Jashuva, Dasaradhi and Gurajada Appa Rao.

References

Indian male poets
Poets from Telangana
People from Khammam district
Telugu-language writers
1927 births
2013 deaths